The AFL Women's best and fairest is awarded to the best and fairest player in the AFL Women's (AFLW) during the home-and-away season, as determined by votes cast by the officiating field umpires after each game. It is the most prestigious award for individual players in the AFL Women's. It is also widely acknowledged as the highest individual honour in women's Australian rules football.

The award has been awarded every year since 2017. Erin Phillips of the Adelaide Football Club was the inaugural winner of the award.

List of winners

Voting system

The voting system for the award has remained the same since its inception in 2017, and is the same as that which has been used for the Australian Football League (AFL)'s Brownlow Medal from 1931–1975 and 1978–present. In this system, the three field umpires confer after each home-and-away match and award three votes, two votes and one vote to the players they regard as the best, second-best and third-best in the match, respectively.

References

External links

 AFLW Awards

Best and fairest winners